Plutonia is a genus of air-breathing land snails, terrestrial pulmonate gastropod molluscs in the family Vitrinidae.

Species
 Plutonia atlantica (Morelet, 1860)
Synonyms
 Plutonia crassa (Groh & Hemmen, 1986) †: synonym of Madeirovitrina crassa (Groh & Hemmen, 1986) †
 Plutonia dianae Valido & M. R. Alonso, 2000: synonym of Canarivitrina dianae (Valido & M. R. Alonso, 2000) (original combination)
 Plutonia falcifera Ibanez & Groh, 2000: synonym of Canarivitrina falcifera (Ibáñez & Groh, 2000) (original combination)
 Plutonia portosantana (Groh & Hemmen, 1986) †: synonym of Madeirovitrina portosantana (Groh & Hemmen, 1986) †
 Plutonia ripkeni M. R. Alonso & Ibanez, 2000: synonym of Canarivitrina ripkeni (M. R. Alonso & Ibáñez, 2000) (original combination)
 Plutonia ruivensis (A. A. Gould, 1846): synonym of Madeirovitrina ruivensis (A. A. Gould, 1846)
 Plutonia solemi Ibáñez & M. R. Alonso, 2001: synonym of Insulivitrina solemi (Ibáñez & M. R. Alonso, 2001) (original combination)
 Plutonia taburientensis Groh & Valido, 2000: synonym of Canarivitrina taburientensis (Groh & Valido, 2000) (original combination)

References

 Bank, R. A. (2017). Classification of the Recent terrestrial Gastropoda of the World. Last update: July 16th, 2017

Vitrinidae